This list covers television programs whose first letter (excluding "the") of the title is H.

H

Numbers
H2O: Just Add Water (Australia)
H8R

HA
Hacks
Half & Half
Halftime Heat
Hallmark Hall of Fame
Hallo K3
Halloween Wars
Hammerman
 Hanazuki: Full of Treasures
Hand of God
Hand Shakers (Japan)
The Handmaid's Tale
Handy Manny
Hangin' with Mr. Cooper
Hannah Montana
Hannibal
Hannity & Colmes
Happily Divorced
Happily Ever After: Fairy Tales for Every Child
Happy (1960–1961)
Happy! (2017–2019)
Happy Days
Happy Endings
Happy Together (South Korea) (1999)
Happy Together (South Korea) (2001)
Happy Together (Russia)
Happy Together (US)
Happy Valley
Happy Tree Friends
Hardcastle and McCormick
The Hard Times of RJ Berger
 The Hardy Boys
The Hardy Boys/Nancy Drew Mysteries
Harley Quinn
Harper's Island
Harris Against the World
Harry (France)
Harry (UK)
Harry (US)
Harry and Bunnie (Malaysia)
Harry the Bunny
Harry O
Hart of Dixie
Hart to Hart
Harvey Beaks
Harvey Birdman, Attorney at Law
Harvey Street Forever
Haunted (UK)
Haunted (US) (2002)
Haunted (US) (2018)
The Haunted
Haunted Collector
The Haunted Hathaways
The Haunting of Hill House
Have Gun - Will Travel
Have I Got News for You (UK)
Haven
The Haves and the Have Nots
Hawaii Five-O (1968)
Hawaii Five-0 (2010)
Hawaii Life
Hawkeye
Hawkins
Hawthorne
Hazbin Hotel (Web series)
Hazel

HB
HBO World Championship Boxing
HBO Storybook Musicals

HE
The Head
Heads Up!
Headbangers Ball
Healer (South Korea)
Heartland (Canada)
The Heartland Series
Heartbeat (UK)
HeartBeat (US) (1988)
Heartbeat (US) (2016)
Heathcliff
Hector's House 
Hee Haw
Heist
Hellcats
Hellevator
Hell on Wheels
Helluva Boss (Web series)
Hell's Kitchen (UK)
Hell's Kitchen (US)
He-Man and the Masters of the Universe
 He-Man and the Masters of the Universe (2002)
 He-Man and the Masters of the Universe (2021)
Henry's Cat
Henry Danger
The Herbs (UK)
Hercules
Hercules: The Legendary Journeys
The Herd with Colin Cowherd
Here Comes Honey Boo Boo
Here We Go Again (1973)
Here We Go Again (2016)
Here's Humphrey
Hergé's Adventures of Tintin
Herman's Head
Hero High
Hero 108       
 Hero Elementary
Heroes
Heroes Reborn
Heston's Feasts
Hex
Hey Arnold!
Hey Dude
Hey Duggee
Hey, Jeannie!
Hey Monie!
Hey Vern, It's Ernest!

HG
HGTV Star

HI
Hi-de-Hi!
Higglytown Heroes
The High Fructose Adventures of Annoying Orange
Highlander
High School Musical: Get in the Picture
High School Musical: The Musical: The Series
 High School USA 
High Society
Highway Patrol
Highway to Heaven
Hi Hi Puffy AmiYumi
Hilda
Hill Street Blues
The Hills
The Hills: New Beginnings
Hip Hop Squares
His and Hers (Australia)
His & Hers (US)
The Hitchhiker
Hitchhikers Guide To The Galaxy
Hilltop Hospital
Hit the Floor

HO
Hoarders
Hockey Wives (Canada)
Hogan Knows Best
Hogan's Heroes
Holby City (UK)
Holiday Baking Championship
Holly & Stephen's Saturday Showdown
Holly Hobbie (Canada)
Hollywood Darlings
Hollywood Divas
Hollywood Game Night
Hollywood Heights
Hollywood Love Story
Hollywood Medium with Tyler Henry
Hollywood Squares
Holly's World
Holmes & Yo-Yo
Holy Foley!
Home: Adventures with Tip & Oh
Home and Away
Home and Family
Home Improvement
Home Movies
Homefront
Homeland
Hometime
Home Town
Hometown
Homewrecker
Homicide: Life on the Street
Homicide: Second Shift
. The Honeymooners
Hong Kong Phooey
Hooten & the Lady  
Hope & Faith
Hope and Gloria
Hopkins
Horne & Corden (UK)
Horrible Histories (UK)
Horrid Henry (UK)
Horseland
Hot in Cleveland
Hot Date
Hot L Baltimore
Hot Potato
Hot Wheels
Hot Wheels Battle Force 5
Hotel
Hotel Impossible
Hotel Transylvania: The Series
The Hotwives
The Hour
House
House Calls
House of Anubis
House of Cards (UK)
House of Cards (US)
House of Carters
House Doctor (UK)
House Hunters
House of Lies
House of Mouse
Houston Beauty
How I Met Your Mother
How It's Made
How Do I Look?
How Do They Do It?
How To Be Indie
How to Get Away with Murder
How To Rock
The Howard Stern Show
Howie Do It
Howdy Doody
Hoze Houndz

HU
Huckleberry Hound
Huff
The Huggabug Club
The Hughleys
Hulk Hogan's Celebrity Championship Wrestling
Hullabaloo
Human Target (1992)
Human Target (2010)
Humans
Humans of New York: The Series
Hung
Hunted (UK) (2012)
Hunted (UK) (2015)
Hunted (US)
Hunter (Australia) (1984)
Hunter (Australia) (1967)
Hunter (UK) (2009)
Hunter (US) (1977)
Hunter (US) (1984–1991)
Huntik: Secrets & Seekers
The Huntress
The Huntley-Brinkley Report
Hurricanes
Hustle
Hunter Street

HY
Hyperdrive

Previous:  List of television programs: G    Next:  List of television programs: I-J